Ishmael is regarded as a prophet and messenger and the ancestor to the Ishmaelites in Islam. He is the son of Ibrahim (Abraham), born to Hajar (Hagar). Ismail is also associated with Mecca and the construction of the Kaaba. Ismail is considered the ancestor to Muhammad.

Ismail is the figure known as Ishmael in Judaism and Christianity. These sources include the Quran, Quranic commentary (tafsir), hadith, historiographic collections like that of Muhammad ibn Jarir al-Tabari, and Isra'iliyat (Islamic texts about Biblical or ancient Israelite figures that originate from Jewish or Christian sources).

Quranic narrative of Ismael

Birth
Ishmael was the first son of Abraham; his mother was Hagar. There are many versions of the story, some of which include a prophecy about Ishmael's birth. One such example is from Ibn Kathir (d.1373) whose account states that an angel tells the pregnant Hagar to name her child Ishmael and prophesies, "His hand would be over everyone, and the hand of everyone would be against him. His brethren would rule over all the lands." Ibn Kathir comments that this foretells of Muhammad's leadership.

Ishmael and Hagar taken to Mecca by Abraham
Ishmael and Hagar being taken to Mecca by Abraham in Islamic texts is an important part in the story of Ishmael, as it brings the focus to Mecca and is the beginning of Mecca's sanctification as a holy area. Islamic tradition says Abraham was ordered by God to take Hagar and Ishmael to Mecca, and later Abraham returned to Mecca to build the Kaaba. In many of these accounts, the Sakina (something like a wind or spirit sent by God), or the angel Gabriel (Jibreel) guides them to the location of the Kaaba, at which point Abraham builds it and afterwards, leaves the other two there (other versions discussed below say the construction of the Kaaba occurred later and that Ishmael took part in it). Generally, it is said that Hagar asks Abraham who he is entrusting herself and Ishmael to as he leaves them. He answers that he is entrusting them to God, to which Hagar then makes a reply that shows her faith, stating that she believes God will guide them. Hagar and Ishmael then run out of water and Ishmael becomes extremely thirsty. Hagar is distressed and searches for water, running back and forth seven times between the hills of Al-Safa and Al-Marwah. Hagar is later remembered by Muslims for this act during the Hajj, or pilgrimage, in which Muslims run between these same hills as part of the Sa'yee. When she returns to Ishmael, she finds either him or an angel scratching the ground with their heel or finger, whereupon water begins flowing and Hagar collects some or dams it up. This spring or well is known as Zamzam. At some point, a passing tribe known as the Jurhum sees birds circling the water and investigates. They ask Hagar if they can settle there, which she allows, and many versions say as Ishmael grew up he learned various things from the tribe. There are numerous versions of this story, each differing in various ways. The versions used in this summary, as well as others, can be found in al-Tabari's history and are recounted in Reuven Firestone's Journeys in Holy Lands.

The sacrifice

While the Tawrat (the Arabic-language name for the Torah within its context as an Islamic holy book), mentions that it was Isaac who was  binded, some Muslims believe that Abraham was told to sacrifice his other son, Ishmael, though the Qur'an does not mention the name of the son. The multiple versions suggest that the dhabih was originally an oral story that had been circulating before being written as it is in the Qur'an and in additional commentaries. Norman Calder explains, "oral narrative is marked by instability of form and detail from version to version, and by an appropriate creative flexibility which makes of every rendering a unique work of art." Each version is indeed a "unique work of art," differing from another in various ways to present certain ideas, such as the importance of Ishmael over Isaac because he was the first child.

The general narrative pertaining to Ishmael describes the sacrifice either as a test or as part of a vow. Some versions tell of the devil trying to stop God's command from being obeyed by visiting Hagar, Ishmael, and Abraham. Every time the devil says Abraham is going to sacrifice Ishmael, each person answers that if God commanded it, they should obey. Eventually, Abraham tells Ishmael about the order and Ishmael is willing to be sacrificed and encourages Abraham to listen to God. Often, Ishmael is portrayed as telling Abraham some combination of instructions to bring his shirt back to Hagar, bind him tightly, sharpen the knife, and place him face down, all so that there will be no wavering in the resolve to obey God.

As Abraham attempts to slay Ishmael, either the knife is turned over in his hand or copper appears on Ishmael to prevent the death and God tells Abraham that he has fulfilled the command. Unlike in the Bible, there is no mention in the Qur'an of an animal (ram) replacing the boy; rather he is replaced with a 'great sacrifice' (dhibḥin ʿaẓīm). Since the sacrifice of a ram cannot be greater than that of Abraham's son (and a prophet in Islam at that), this replacement seems to point to either the religious institutionalisation of sacrifice itself, or to the future self-sacrifices of the Islamic prophet Muhammad and his companions (who were destined to emerge from the progeny of Ishmael) in the cause of their faith.  Every Eid al-Adha once a year Muslims around the world slaughter an animal to commemorate Abraham's sacrifice and to remind themselves of self-abnegation in the way of God. Later historiographic literature incorporates the Biblical narrative in which a ram is provided which is slaughtered instead of Ishmael.

The actions of Ishmael in this narrative have led him to become a prominent model of hospitality and obedience. This story in the Quran is unique when compared to that in the Bible because Abraham talks with his son, whichever it is believed to be, and the son is thus aware of the plan to become a sacrifice and approves of it. As noted above, in some versions, Ishmael makes sure in different ways that neither he nor his father hesitate in their obedience to God. In this way, Ishmael is a model of surrendering one's will to God, an essential characteristic in Islam.

Though it is generally believed by modern Muslims that Ishmael was the son who was almost sacrificed, among scholars and historiographers of early Islam, there is much debate. There are such persuasive arguments for both, in fact, it is estimated that 131 traditions say Isaac was the son, while 133 say Ishmael. Such dispute over which son suggests that the story, and where and to whom it happens, is extremely important. It is argued that the story originated from rabbinic texts and was adapted to Islam over time in order to give Mecca religious importance and connect the story with the pilgrimage.Arguments by early Muslim scholars for Ishmael as the intended sacrifice include that Jews claim it is Isaac only because they are jealous that it was actually the ancestor of Arabs, Ishmael, and that the horns of the ram that was sacrificed instead hung in the Kaaba at one time. In looking solely at the text of the Quran to determine which son was to be sacrificed, there still are various views. The strongest case for Ishmael in the Quran is that directly after the sacrifice narrative, Abraham is told of the coming of Isaac's birth, therefore, it must be Ishmael who was about to be sacrificed. Authentic hadiths are said to not contradict each other because that negates the definition of the hadith.

Construction of the Kaaba
At some point, often believed to be after Hagar's death, Ishmael married a woman from the Jurhum, the tribe who settled in the area around Zamzam. Abraham visited Ishmael in Mecca and when he arrived at his home, Ishmael was not there. Instead Ishmael's wife greets Abraham, but she was not welcoming or generous to him. Abraham instructed her to tell Ishmael some version of the statement that he was not pleased with or to change "the threshold of his door." When Ishmael returns home and his wife told him that, he knows it is from his father and taking the advice, divorced the woman. He then married another woman from Jurhum. Abraham once again visited and was met by Ishmael's second wife, as Ishmael was out. This wife was very kind and provided food for him. Abraham instructed her to tell Ishmael some version of the statement that he was pleased with "the threshold of his door." When Ishmael arrived and his wife repeated Abraham's statement, Ishmael knew it was from his father and kept his wife.

There are many versions of the construction of the Kaaba that differ in fairly significant ways, although all have Abraham build or cleanse the Kaaba and then immediately after, or at an unknown time, God called Abraham to establish the Hajj, or pilgrimage. These narratives differ in when these events occurred, if and how there was supernatural involvement, the inclusion or omission of the Black Stone, and whether Ishmael assisted his father. Of those that say Ishmael took part in the construction, most describe Abraham visited Ishmael a third time in Mecca, during which they raised the Kaaba. Some say Ishmael looked for a final stone, but Abraham did not accept the one he brought back. Instead an angel had brought the Black Stone, which Abraham put into place. Ishmael was left at the Kaaba, in charge of its care and to teach others about the Hajj. The starting of the Hajj has many versions, and some scholars believe this reflects the late association of Abraham with the Hajj after Islam had developed to help remove its connection to early pagan rituals.

In Islamic thought

Prophetic career
Ishmael is considered a prophet in Islam and is listed in the Quran with other prophets in many instances. In other verses, such as 21:85 and 38:48, Ishmael is praised for being patient, good, and righteous. A particular example which describes Ishmael individually is 19:54-55 – "And call to mind, through this divine writ, Ishmael. Behold, he was always true to his promise, and was an apostle [of God], a prophet, who used to enjoin upon his people prayer and charity, and found favour in his Sustainer's sight." As an alleged descendant of Ishmael, Muhammad is considered justified as the Prophet and continues the line of prophets from pre-Islamic times.

Genealogy and association with Arabs

Ishmael's place as the "founder of the Arabs" was first stated by Josephus. As Islam became established, the figure Ishmael and those descended from him, the Ishmaelites, became connected, and often equated, with the term Arab in early Jewish and Christian literature. Before Islam developed as a religion, Ishmael was depicted in many ways, but after its establishment, Ishmael was almost always seen in a negative light in Jewish and Christian texts, as he becomes the symbol for the "other" in these religions. As the Islamic community became more powerful, some Jewish midrash about Ishmael was modified so that he was portrayed more negatively in order to challenge the Islamic view that Ishmael, and thus the Muslims, were the favoured descendants of Abraham. This became the genealogy according to Jewish sources and the Bible, in contrast with the genealogy of Arabs according to Muslims. The development of Islam created pressure for Islam to be somehow different from Judaism and Christianity, and accordingly, Ishmael's lineage to Arabs was stressed.

Today, some Christians believe that God fulfills his promises to Ishmael today by blessing the Arab nations with oil and political strength. In pre-Islamic times, there were three distinct groups of Arabs- the Ba'ida, Ariba, and Musta'riba. The Ba'ida were the "legendary Arabs of the past," while the Ariba were the "Southern Arabs." Ishmael's descendants became the Northern Arabs known as the Musta'riba or the "Arabized Arabs." The Musta'riba were described as Arabized since it is believed Ishmael learned Arabic when he moved to Mecca and married into the Arabic tribe of Jurhum. Ishmael's line is then traced from his son Kedar, then down through to Adnan, then to the Musta'riba, to the Quraysh. In this manner, Muhammad's ancestry leads back to Ishmael, joining "original biblical ancestry of Abraham with a distinctively Arab afinal stock," and connecting Muhammad with Mecca and the Kaaba.

See also
Abraham in Islam
Binding of Isaac
Muhammad in Islam

References

Hebrew Bible prophets of the Quran